Protopopescu is a Romanian surname. Notable people with the surname include:

Dana Protopopescu, Romanian pianist
Dragoș Protopopescu (1892–1948), Romanian writer, poet, critic, and philosopher
Ștefan Protopopescu (1886–1929), Romanian officer and aviation pioneer

Romanian-language surnames